Xweshkarih i Redagan (The duty of children) is a Middle Persian text for Zoroastrian children on how to behave accordingly. The work was most likely composed after the Sasanian era (224–651).

References

Sources 
 

Middle Persian
Zoroastrian texts